Whatever You Love, You Are is the fifth studio album by Australian trio, Dirty Three, which was released in March 2000. It won at the 2000 ARIA Music Awards for Best Alternative Release. Cover art is by their guitarist, Mick Turner. Australian musicologist, Ian McFarlane, felt that it showed "deep, rich, emotional musical vistas, and furthered the band’s connection to the music and approach of jazz great John Coltrane".

Reception

Track listing

 "Some Summers They Drop Like Flies" – 6:20
 "I Really Should've Gone Out Last Night" – 6:55
 "I Offered It Up to the Stars & the Night Sky" – 13:41
 "Some Things I Just Don't Want to Know" – 6:07
 "Stellar" – 7:29
 "Lullabye for Christie" – 7:45

References 

General
  Note: Archived [on-line] copy has limited functionality.
Specific

2000 albums
ARIA Award-winning albums
Dirty Three albums
Touch and Go Records albums